Los Cedros Creek (Quebrada Los Cedros in Spanish) is a stream in Peru located in Huaylas Province, Ancash. It is a right tributary of the Santa River which flows to the Pacific Ocean.

It originates west of mount Alpamayo and runs mainly to the west until its confluence with the Santa River near the village of Los Cedros.

The upstream section receives the name Alpamayo (possibly from Quechua allpa earth, mayu river, "earth river").

See also 
 Santa Cruz Creek

References

Rivers of Peru
Rivers of Ancash Region